The 1977 Transamerica Open, also known as the Pacific Coast Championships, was a men's tennis tournament played on indoor carpet courts at the Cow Palace in San Francisco, California in the United States. The event was part of the 4 Star category of the  1977 Grand Prix circuit and Barry MacKay was the tournament director. It was the 89th edition of the tournament and was held from September 26 through October 2, 1977. The singles event had a field of 64 players. Unseeded Butch Walts won the singles title.

Finals

Singles
 Butch Walts defeated  Brian Gottfried 4–6, 6–3, 7–5
 It was Walts's 1st singles title of the year and the 2nd of his career.

Doubles
 Dick Stockton /  Marty Riessen defeated  Fred McNair /  Sherwood Stewart 6–4, 1–6, 6–4

References

External links
 ITF tournament edition details

Pacific Coast International Open
Pacific Coast International Open
Pacific Coast International Open
Pacific Coast International Open
Pacific Coast International Open
Pacific Coast International Open